Efkleidis Kourtidis (1885–1937) was a Greek resistance leader of Pontos. He fought Turkish troops from the Pontic Alps near Sanda.

He was born in the Ishanandon village of Sanda.

Kourtidis was the head of Greek guerrilla forces based in the town of Santa (Dumanlı), Pontos, that resisted Turkish bands. Kourtidis' struggle with the Turkish army was prolonged; his guerrillas refused to come down from the mountains. However, he was still able to send messages to people outside of Sanda, including the Metropolitan of Rodopolis. During the Pontic Greek Genocide (1912–1922), he rescued a large number of women and children from the advancing Kemalist armies. They were finally transported safely to Greece.

His statue is erected in Nea Santa, Kilkis, Greece. The statue also bears the names of 141 known Greek genocide victims from Sanda. Upon his death in 1937, Kourtidis' friend wrote a song about him.

References

External links
Biography

1885 births
1937 deaths
Ottoman Pontians
Guerrillas
Emigrants from the Ottoman Empire to Greece
People from Gümüşhane